Cyril Harry Alfred Lakin (29 December 1893 – 23 June 1948) was a Welsh politician and farmer who was the Conservative Party Member of Parliament (MP) for Llandaff and Barry in South Wales. He won the seat at a by-election in June 1942, with a 5,655 majority over an independent Labour candidate, but was defeated at the 1945 general election by the official Labour Party candidate Lynn Ungoed-Thomas.

Lakin lived in London, his family lived at Highlight Farm in Barry, Vale of Glamorgan. His wife was Vera Marjory Savill, whom he married in 1926. They had one daughter Bridget, who was born in 1927. He died in France and his wife died on the Isle of Wight in 1990.

References

Sources
www.barrywales.co.uk

External links 
 

1893 births
1948 deaths
Welsh farmers
People from the Vale of Glamorgan
Conservative Party (UK) MPs for Welsh constituencies
Members of the Parliament of the United Kingdom for Cardiff constituencies
UK MPs 1935–1945